Tiina Piia Susanna Kankaanpää (born August 16, 1976 in Seinäjoki) is a retired female discus thrower from Finland. She set her personal best (61.04 metres) on July 11, 1999 at a meet in Jalasjärvi.

Achievements

External links

1976 births
Living people
People from Seinäjoki
Finnish female discus throwers
Sportspeople from South Ostrobothnia